This article lists census-designated places (CDPs) in the U.S. state of Vermont. At the 2010 census, there were a total of 73 CDPs in Vermont.

Census-Designated Places

See also
 List of cities in Vermont
 List of towns in Vermont

References

 
Vermont
Census-designated places